"Alibi" is a pop / dance song released in 2013 by Swedish singer of Persian origin Eddie Razaz. He had been a contestant in Swedish Idol 2009 finishing sixth and eventually forming the duo REbound! with fellow Idol contestant Rabih Jaber. After breaking-up, Razaz decided to go on with a solo career.

Razaz took part in Melodifestivalen 2013 on 16 February 2013, in a bid to represent Sweden in Eurovision Song Contest 2013 in Malmö, Sweden. The song was co-written by Thomas G:son and Peter Boström and performed by Razaz in the third semi-final leg of the competition, but it failed to move forward to the finale.

Chart performance
Despite the song not qualifying to the national finals of Melodifestivalen, it proved very popular with the Swedish public and the song charted in the Sverigetopplistan official Swedish Singles Chart at the end of the competition in March 2013. It is Razaz' first charting single after break-up of REbound!

Charts

References

2013 songs
2013 singles
Melodifestivalen songs of 2013
Songs written by Peter Boström
Songs written by Thomas G:son
Warner Music Group singles